Jean-François-Louis-Marie-Albert-Gaspard Grimod (15 June 1772 – 26 December 1843), comte d'Orsay, was a Bonapartist general and nobleman.

Biography 
He was the son of the collector Pierre Gaspard Grimod, comte d'Orsay (1748–1809) and his first wife, Princess Marie Louise Amélie de Croÿ-Molembais, (1748–1772), daughter of Prince Guillaume François de Croÿ and Anne Françoise Amélie de Trazegnies. She died in giving birth to him and his father began travelling Europe for consolation, gathering famous paintings and sculptures into a notable collection.

He married again, to Princess Marie Anne of Hohenlohe-Waldenburg-Bartenstein, on 22 August 1784. The couple moved to Germany in 1787, meaning that - on the outbreak of the French Revolution two years later - Albert's father was declared an émigré and their property in France was seized. They were left in the poverty in which Albert's father died.

In 1792 Albert married Eleonore Franchi, Freiin von Franquemont (17 January 1771 - 1833) an illegitimate daughter of the reigning Duke of Württemberg by the Italian adventuress Anna Eleonora Franchi. Their surviving son became the dandy, Alfred Guillaume Gabriel, Count d'Orsay. Their daughter Ida Grimaud d'Orsay married Antoine, 9th duc de Gramont in 1818, and became mother of Antoine, 10th duc de Gramont, a lover of Marie Duplessis, on whose life was based the roman à clef, La Dame aux camélias, by Dumas, fils.

He became a Général de brigade in Napoleon I's Grande Armée on 19 November 1813, a year before Napoleon's abdication and first exile.  It is unknown what role he played in the previous and subsequent events of the Napoleonic Wars, or whether he supported Napoleon during the Hundred Days or at Waterloo, but he did survive the wars to see the Bourbon Restoration and the July Monarchy, dying five years before the end of the latter.

He was sold the chateau at Rupt-sur-Saône (then state property) in 1820.

External links
A letter from him to Napoleon (from here)

Counts of the First French Empire
Counts of Orsay
1772 births
1843 deaths